Justice Dorsey may refer to:

Thomas Beale Dorsey (1780–1855), associate justice of the Maryland Court of Appeals
Walter Dorsey (1771–1823), associate justice of the Maryland Court of Appeals

See also
Judge Dorsey (disambiguation)